For the Rowing competition at the 2002 Asian Games in Busan, South Korea, men's and women's singles, doubles, and fours competed at the Nakdong River Rowing and Canoeing Courses from September 30 to October 3.

Schedule

Medalists

Men

Women

Medal table

Participating nations
A total of 196 athletes from 17 nations competed in rowing at the 2002 Asian Games:

References 

2002 Asian Games Official Reports, Pages 516–566

References
Official Website

 
2002 Asian Games events
2002
Asian Games
2002 Asian Games